Patricia Ann Granger (born 1939) is a British crime writer.

Granger was born in Portsmouth, England.  She took a Modern Languages degree at the University of London, taught English for a year in France, but eventually went to work in the visa sections of British consulates and embassies in Yugoslavia, Czechoslovakia and Austria. She married a colleague in the foreign service and went with him to Zambia and Germany before returning to live in England with their two children.

Her first novels were historical romances published under the nom de plume Ann Hulme. After her return to England, her first crime novel, Say It with Poison, was published in 1991.

Bibliography

Historical romances (selection)

A Poor Relation (1979)
Summer Heiress (1982)
The Garden of the Azure Dragon (1986)
The Unexpected American (1989)
A Scandalous Bargain (1990)
False Fortune (1991)

Mitchell & Markby mysteries

Say It with Poison (1991)
A Season For Murder (1991)
Cold in the Earth (1992)
Murder Among Us (1992)
Where Old Bones Lie (1993)
Flowers For His Funeral (1994)
A Fine Place For Death (1994)
Candle For a Corpse (1995)
A Word After Dying (1996)
A Touch of Mortality (1996)
Call the Dead Again (1998)
Beneath these Stones (1999)
Shades of Murder (2000)
A Restless Evil (2002)
That Way Murder Lies (2004) (the final Mitchell & Markby novel)
Deadly Company (2022)

Fran Varady mysteries

Asking for Trouble (1997)
Keeping Bad Company (1997)
Running Scared (1998)
Risking It All (2001)
Watching Out (2003)
Mixing With Murder (2005)
Rattling the Bones (2007)

Ben Ross & Lizzie Martin mysteries

A Rare Interest in Corpses (2006)
A Mortal Curiosity (2008)
A Better Quality of Murder (2010)
A Particular Eye for Villainy (2012)
 The Testimony of the Hanged Man (2014)
 The Dead Woman of Deptford (2016)
 The Murderer's Apprentice (2019)
 The Truth-Seeker's Wife (2021)
 The Old Rogue of Limehouse (2023)

Campbell & Carter mysteries

Mud, Muck and Dead things (2009)
Rack, Ruin and Murder (2011)
Bricks and Mortality (2013)
Dead in the Water (2015)
Rooted in Evil (2017)
An Unfinished Murder (2018) (featuring Mitchell & Markby)
A Matter of Murder (2020)

Short Story Collections

Mystery in the Making (2021)

References

1939 births
Living people
English crime fiction writers
Alumni of the University of London
Members of the Detection Club
English women novelists
Women mystery writers